The Schlern Formation, also known as Schlern Dolomite, and Sciliar Formation or Sciliar Dolomite in Italy, is a limestone, marl and dolomite formation in the Southern Limestone Alps in Kärnten, Austria and South Tyrol, Italy.

Description 

It preserves fossils dating back to the Middle Triassic period (late Anisian-middle Ladinian), or Illyrian to Longobardian in the regional stratigraphy. The formation correlates with the Wetterstein Formation of the Northern Limestone Alps. The formation is also coeval with the Livinallongo or Buchenstein Formation. The Schlern Formation is unconformably overlain by the Cassian Dolomite, and overlies the Contrin Formation separated by another unconformity. Deposition of the formation took place between the Pelsonian Humid Interval and the Ladinian Humid Interval, that preceded the better known Carnian Pluvial Event (CPE).

In Italy, the unit is recognized in the Civetta and Latemar reef buildups, and in Austria at the Gartnerkofel.

Fossil content 
Among others, the following fossils have been described from the Schlern Formation:
Bivalves
 Daonella esinensis
Gastropods

 Cassianopsis decussata
 Coelostylina conica
 Fedaiella neritacea
 Hologyra alpina
 H. elevata
 Hologyra (Vernelia) dissimilis
 Loxonema aequale
 Neritaria plicatilis
 Palaeonarica concentrica
 Promathildia pygmaea
 Pustulifer alpina
 Tyrsoecus (Stephanocosmia)
 Zygopleura spinosa

See also 

 List of fossiliferous stratigraphic units in Austria
 List of fossiliferous stratigraphic units in Italy
 Bletterbach

References

Bibliography 

 
    Text and images are available under a  Creative Commons Attribution 4.0 International License

Further reading 
 A. Emmerich, V. Zamparelli, T. Bechstädt and R. Zühlke. 2005. The reefal margin and slope of a Middle Triassic carbonate platform: the Latemar (Dolomites, Italy). Facies 50(3-4):573-614
 J. Pfeiffer. 1988. Paleontology and microfacies of a platform margin in the Carnic Alps (Austria, Middle Triassic). Facies 19:33-60
 E. Fois and M. Gaetani. 1981. The northern margin of the Civetta buildup. Evolution during the Ladinian and the Carnian. Rivista Italiana di Paleontologia e stratigrafia 86(3):469-542
 E. Fois. 1981. The Sass da Putia carbonate buildup (western Dolomites): biofacies succession and marginal development during the Ladinian. Rivista Italiana di Paleontologia e Stratigrafia 87(4):565-598

Geologic formations of Austria
Geologic formations of Italy
Triassic System of Europe
Triassic Austria
Triassic Italy
Anisian Stage
Ladinian Stage
Dolomite formations
Limestone formations
Marl formations
Reef deposits
Shallow marine deposits
Paleontology in Austria
Paleontology in Italy
Southern Limestone Alps
Geology of the Alps
Formations
Formations